This is a list of operational and former Australian prisons for adult males and females and youth detention centres for juveniles. Prisons listed as "museum" are former prisons that are now open for public inspection and tours.

Throughout the European history of Australia, particularly since its formation as a penal colony, Australia has had many establishments for rehabilitation and incarceration. Altogether, there have been more than 180+ rehabilitation centres, youth correctional centres and prisons in Australia.

Australian Capital Territory 

A new prison was opened on 11 September 2008 at Hume, called the Alexander Maconochie Centre, named after Alexander Maconochie. The centre is designed as a multi role facility to replace the Belconnen Remand Centre and provide detention facilities so that prisoners who are currently held in New South Wales facilities may be held locally.

New South Wales 

The following list of operational and closed correctional facilities has been sourced from the Corrective Services NSW and from the State Records archives.

 Cooma commenced operations on 1 November 1873 with 31 cells. In 1876 it was reduced to a Police Gaol and then a temporary Lunatic Asylum in 1877. The Centre closed temporarily in the early 1900s. The Gaol reopened on 8 March 1957 and was again closed 10 July 1998. Cooma Correctional Centre reopened for the second time in November 2001.
 Maitland, now closed, had capacity for 400 inmates at its peak.

Northern Territory

Queensland

South Australia 

 

Prisons in South Australia are managed by the South Australian, Department for Correctional Services apart from the Mount Gambier Prison and Adelaide Remand Centre which are managed by GSL Group.

Tasmania

Victoria 
  

 

Adult Prisons and correctional facilities in Victoria are managed by Corrections Victoria. Two prisons are privatised and managed by G4S Australia Pty. Limited and GEO Group Australia Pty. Limited.  Youth Justice custodial centres are managed by the Department of Justice and Community Safety.

Victorian Prisons are mostly located in regional Victoria. The prison system is relatively modern with the closure of the last of the "old" gaols in 2005. Bendigo and Won Wron were the last to be closed. Beechworth Prison was closed in 2004 and replaced with the Beechworth Correctional Centre the following year. New prisons are being built or planned at Ararat and Ravenhall.  Many prisons have had recent expansions in terms of bed numbers.

At 30 June 2015 there were 4,769 sentenced prisoners and 1,413 unsentenced prisoners in Victoria, thus making a total of 6,182 prisoners. From those 6,182 prisoners, 5,762 were males (93%) and 420 were females (7%). Those numbers also include 480 Aboriginal and Torres Strait Islander prisoners, making them 8% of the total number of prisoners in Victoria.

In 2015, the average male prisoner in Victoria was:
 35.5 years old
 born in Australia
 did not complete high school
 a history of alcohol and drug abuse
 single and unemployed at the time he entered the prison system
 sentence of three years in a medium security prison
 more likely than not to have been imprisoned previously
In 2015, the average female prisoner in Victoria was:
 36 years old
 born in Australia
 single or in a de facto relationship
 likely to be a mother/primary care giver
 unemployed, home duties or on a pension before prison
 has a higher level of education than her male counterpart but still failed to complete high school
 sentence of less than two years
 likely to be in prison for the first time
At 30 June 2015, the total operational capacity for Victorian prisons was 7,093 and had a utilisation rate of 90.5%.

Western Australia 
Prisons and correctional facilities in Western Australia are managed by the Department of Justice through public and private operators.

See also 

 List of prisons
 List of Australian immigration detention facilities
 List of Australian psychiatric institutions
 List of Australian penal colonies
 List of Australians in international prisons
 Capital punishment in Australia

References

Prisons
Australia
Prisons
Australian crime-related lists